The Polish Catholic Church, or Catholic Church in Poland, is part of the Roman Catholic Church under the spiritual leadership of the Pope in Rome, and the Episcopal Conference of Poland. There are 41 Catholic dioceses of the Latin Church and three eparchies of the Eastern Churches in Poland. These comprise about 10,000 parishes and religious orders. There are 33 million registered Catholics (the data includes the number of infants baptized) in Poland. The primate of the Church is Wojciech Polak, Archbishop of Gniezno. According to 2015 demographics, 92.9% of Poland's population is Roman Catholic. Other statistics suggest this number could be as low as 85.8%.

History

Ever since Poland officially adopted Latin Christianity in 966, the Catholic Church has played an important religious, cultural and political role in the country. Identifying oneself as Catholic distinguished Polish culture and nationality from neighbouring Germany, especially eastern and northern Germany, which is mostly Lutheran, and the countries to the east which are Orthodox. During times of foreign oppression, the Catholic Church was a cultural guard in the fight for independence and national survival. For instance, the Polish abbey in Częstochowa, which successfully resisted a siege in the Swedish invasion of Poland in the 17th century, became a symbol of national resistance to the occupation. The establishment of a communist regime controlled by the Soviet Union following World War II allowed the Church to continue fulfilling this role, although recent allegations suggest there was some minor collaboration between Polish clergy and the regime.

The 1978 election of Polish Cardinal Karol Wojtyła as Pope John Paul II strengthened the ties of identification. John Paul's visits to Poland became rallying points for the faithful and galvanized opposition to the Soviet regime. His beatification in 2011 and canonization 3 years later further instilled pride and joy in the Polish people. In 2013, Pope Francis, John Paul II's 2nd successor (and who was made a cardinal by the Polish pope), announced that World Youth Day, the world's largest religious gathering of young people, would be held in Kraków, Poland in 2016.

In 2013 a succession of child sex abuse scandals within the Church, and the poor response by the Church, became a matter of some public concern. The church resisted demands to pay compensation to victims.

Number of Catholics in Poland

As of 2005 a majority of Poles, approximately 88%, identified themselves as Catholic, and 58% said they are active practicing Catholics, according to a survey by the Centre for Public Opinion Research. According to the Ministry of Foreigns Affairs of the Republic of Poland, 95% of Poles belong to the Catholic Church; this survey bases the number of adherents on the number of infants baptized, as provided by the Catholic Church. The CIA Factbook gives a number of 87.2% belonging to the Catholic Church in 2012.
In the biggest part of Europe, the rates of religious observance have steadily decreased. However, Poland still remains one of the most devoutly religious countries in Europe. Polish Catholics participate in the sacraments more frequently than their counterparts in most Western European and North American countries. A 2009 study by the Church itself revealed that 80% of Poles go to confession at least once a year, while 60% of the respondents say they do so more often than once a year. By contrast, a 2005 study by Georgetown University's Center for Applied Research on the Apostolate revealed that only 14% of American Catholics take part in the sacrament of penance once a year, with a mere 2% doing so more frequently. Tarnów is the most religious city in Poland, and Łódź is the least. The southern and eastern parts of Poland are more active in their religious practices than those of the West and North. The majority of Poles continue to declare themselves Catholic. This is in stark contrast to the otherwise similar neighboring Czech Republic, which is one of the least religious practicing areas on Earth, with only 19% declaring "they believe there is a God" of any kind.

A 2014 survey conducted by the Church found that the number of Polish Catholics attending Sunday Mass had fallen by two million over the last decade, with 39% of baptized Catholics regularly attending Mass in 2014. At the same time, however, this partly results from the fact that since 2004 2.1 million Poles have emigrated to Western Europe. Writing for the Catholic weekly Tygodnik Powszechny, Church sociologist Rev. Prof. Janusz Mariański has noted that these two million Polish emigrants are still listed in their parish records as members, so when Mass attendance is measured such emigres lower the official records. The proportion of Mass attendees receiving Holy Communion is rising, while the number of Polish Catholic priests continues to rise as ordinations outpace deaths in Poland, though the number of nuns is decreasing. The survey found that regular Sunday Mass attendance varies by dioceses from a high Diocese of Tarnów (69%) to a low Archdiocese of Szczecin-Kamień (24.3%), and reception of Holy Communion from 23.7% in the Tarnów diocese down to 10.4% in the diocese of Koszalin-Kołobrzeg.

Religious practice 

The Centre for Public Opinion Research regularly conducts surveys on religious practice in Poland. A 2012 document reported that for more than a quarter-century church attendance and declarations of religious faith have been stable, decreasing only minimally since 2005 when the grief related to the death of Pope John Paul II led to an increase in religious practice among Poles. In a 2012 study, 42% of Poles declared that they attend religious services at least once a week, 18% do so once or twice a month, 32% do so several times a year, and only 8% do so never or almost never. Meanwhile, 94% of Poles consider themselves to be religious believers (9% of whom consider themselves "deeply religious"), while only 6% of Poles claim that they are non-believers. According to the Church's own sources, 39.1% of Catholics required to attend the Sunday Mass, take part in it.

Easter continues to be an important holiday for Polish Catholics. According to a 2012 study by the CBOS (Centre for Public Opinion Research), 74% of Poles make an effort to participate in the sacrament of penance before Easter, 59% make an effort to attend the Stations of the Cross or Gorzkie żale (an increase of 6% since 2003), 57% want to improve themselves for the better (an increase of 7%), 49% want to help the needy (an increase of 8%), and 46% want to pray more (a decline of 5%).

A CBOS opinion poll from April 2014 found the following:

Apostasy

During the October 2020 Polish protests, enquiries regarding the procedure for apostasy from the Polish Catholic Church became popular. Web search engine queries showed high frequencies for "apostasy" and "how to do apostasy", and a Facebook event titled "Quit the church at Christmas" was followed by 5000 people.

, the formal apostasy procedure in the Polish Catholic Church is a procedure defined on 7 October 2015 by the Episcopal Conference of Poland, which became effective as of 19 February 2016. It can only be done in person, by delivering an application to a church parish priest. The procedure cannot be done by email, post, or state administrative services.

Latin territories
Archdiocese
Diocese

Latin names of dioceses in italics.

Białystok, Bialostocensis (1)
Drohiczyn, Drohiczinensis (2)
Łomża, Lomzensis (3)
Cracow, Cracoviensis (4)
Bielsko–Żywiec, Bielscensis-Zyviecensis (5)
Kielce, Kielcensis (6)
Tarnów, Tarnoviensis (7)
Częstochowa, Czestochoviensis (8)
Radom, Radomensis (9)
Sosnowiec, Sosnoviensis (10)
Gdańsk, Gedanensis (11)
Pelplin, Pelplinensis (12)
Toruń, Thoruniensis (13)
Gniezno, Gnesnensis (14)
Bydgoszcz, Bydgostiensis (15)
Włocławek, Vladislaviensis (16)
Katowice, Katovicensis (17)
Gliwice, Glivicensis (18)
Opole, Opoliensis (19)
Łódź, Lodziensis (20)
Łowicz, Lovicensis (21)
Lublin, Lublinensis (22)
Sandomierz, Sandomiriensis (23)
Siedlce, Siedlecensis (24)
Poznań, Posnaniensis (25)
Kalisz, Calissiensis (26)
Przemyśl, Premisliensis (27)
Rzeszów, Rzeszoviensis (28)
Zamość-Lubaczów, Zamosciensis-Lubaczoviensis (29)
Szczecin-Kamień, Sedinensis-Caminensis (30)
Koszalin-Kołobrzeg, Coslinensis-Colubreganus (31)
Zielona Góra-Gorzów Wielkopolski, Viridimontanensis-Gorzoviensis (32)
Warmia (Olsztyn), Varmiensis (33)
Elbląg, Elbingensis (34)
Ełk, Liccanensis (35)
Warsaw, Varsaviensis (36)
Płock, Plocensis (37)
Warsaw-Praga, Varsaviensis-Pragensis (38)
Wrocław, Vratislaviensis (39)
Legnica, Legnicensis (40)
Świdnica, Suidniciensis (41)

Ukrainian Greek Catholic territory

Archeparchy
Eparchies
Ukrainian Catholic Archeparchy of Przemyśl–Warsaw 
Ukrainian Catholic Eparchy of Olsztyn–Gdańsk
Ukrainian Catholic Eparchy of Wrocław-Koszalin

Extraterritorial units
Military Ordinariate of Polish Army

See also
 The Most Holy Virgin Mary, Queen of Poland
 List of saints of Poland
 Religion in Poland
 Religious denominations in Poland
 List of Catholic dioceses in Poland
 List of Polish cardinals
 Reorganization of occupied dioceses during World War II
 Nazi persecution of the Catholic Church in Poland
 Ukrainian Greek Catholic Church

References

Further reading
 Frucht, Richard. Eastern Europe: An Introduction to the People, Lands, and Culture. Volume 1. ABD-CLIO inc. Santa Barbara, Ca.

External links
 Conference of the Episcopate of Poland 
 Apostasy in Poland
 Procedura apostazji: poradnik i wzór oświadczenia 
 Apostazja.info - Jak wypisać się z Kościoła katolickiego 
 Home 
 Apostazja – instrukcja krok po kroku i wzory dokumentów 

 
Poland
Poland
Polish culture